Myracrodruon urundeuva (Portuguese common names: aroeira-do-sertão, aroeira preta, urundeúva, urindeúva, arindeúva) is a timber tree, which is often used for beekeeping. This plant is native to Argentina, Brazil, Bolivia and Paraguay, and it is typical of Caatinga, Cerrado, and Pantanal vegetation in Brazil.

Control

It is reported that the plant is very susceptible to particular herbicides such as glyphosate, suggesting a restricted and proper weed management for the species.

References and notes

External links
 Astronium urundeuva (Fr. Allem.) Engl. (Urunde'y mi)'

Anacardiaceae
Trees of Argentina
Trees of Bolivia
Trees of Brazil
Trees of Paraguay
Flora of the Cerrado